was a Japanese photographer.

References

Japanese photographers
1934 births
2020 deaths
Place of birth missing